Telenzepine is a thienobenzodiazepine acting as selective M1 antimuscarinic. It is used in the treatment of peptic ulcers. Telenzepine is atropisomeric, in other words the molecule has a stereogenic C–N-axis. In neutral aqueous solution it displays a half-life for racemization of the order of 1000 years. The enantiomers have been resolved. The activity is related to the (+)-isomer which is about 500-fold more active than the (–)-isomer at muscarinic receptors in the rat cerebral cortex.

See also 
 Pirenzepine

References

External links 

 

Piperazines
Muscarinic antagonists
Carboxamides
Lactams
Thienobenzodiazepines